Furg Citadel, (Arg e Furg, also known as Forg citadel and Mirza Rafi Khan citadel),  is an 18th-century citadel located in Furg Village in Darmian County, South Khorasan, Iran.

Furg Citadel was constructed by Meerza Muhammad Rafiee Darmiany I (Lama). It was registered in the List of National Works on March 18, 2001.

Name 
There are different origin stories for the name of Forg/Furg. One of the  more common is that Forg was commonly pronounced Fork among the people. The Dehkhoda Dictionary, in a quote from the Encyclopedia, explicitly mentions that Fork was the name of the ancestor of a family in Iran, and is an Iranian name.

Another version is that Fork was the name of the daughter of "Ryan Konouj", an Indian king. Fork was the wife of Bahram Gour (as stated in Borhan), and/or perhaps it stems from the Persian word pour, meaning "son".

Some others theories attribute Fork to the founder of this village, i.e. Mozafar Keyghobad, and based on an inscription on which the year of 307 is written, they infer that as the founder of this village was initially "Pour Keyghobad", it was first called "Pourg", and then renamed to Fork and then to Forg over time

Location 
Furg Citadel is located on the north side of Fork Village at an altitude of 1840 meters.  It is on the edge of the heights of Darmian Valley, leading to the  Asadiyeh plain. The citadel has a commanding view of the village, farms and roads in the area.

Furg Citadel covers about 9,200 square meters, extending from east to west. The main entrance of the citadel is in the eastern walls, the lowest point of the citadel.

One of the key features of the citadel is its physical and spatial structure, which follows the topography of its location. The main weakness of this location is the close proximity of the citadel to the mountains.  This benefit to attackers using cannon was pointed out in Einolvaghaye.

Of course, in respect of the problem mentioned above, it ought to be noted that the location of the citadel should be studied within its own time. Perhaps in the era of Naseri (Naser al-Din Shah) in which cannons were vastly used in local wars in the region, this vulnerability of the citadel has been revealed, while; in the early periods that these weapons were not common, perhaps it provided the best location.

Description 
The citadel today has three major sections

Section 1 
Section 1 of the citadel contains a barn on the east side that served as living quarters for the staff, as a cattle barn and as a dock warehouse.

This section also includes a citadel entrance, guard towers, water storage and other spaces.  Owing to existence of the remnants of tower and ramparts in section 1, it was probably the second defensive line of the citadel

Section 2 
Section 2 is a tall central area that is 50 meters from the storage areas, armory and barracks. The citadel has a brick tower with cruciform or lozenge design decorations in the northeast corner.  it is known as the penthouse tower..

Section 3 
Section 3 encompasses two floors overlooking the village and roads of the area.  It is located in the west and is separated from section 2 by two towers and fortified and long walls. Section 3 is considered the alcove of the citadel and has more untouched spaces than the previous two parts. The existence of spaces like the vestibule, connecting corridors, stables, food storage, watchtowers and spaces with other applications are the most important features of section 3.  Most of the second floor has been destroyed.

Tunnel 
The citadel has a tunnel with an exit door.  It was designed for water supply during a siege or for evacuation.The tunnel has approximately 100 usable stairs.

The current tunnel was allegedly used during the battle between Mirza Rafi Khan with Mir Alam Khan and his son Amir Asadollah Khan.  This battle is referred to in Einolvaghaye"… Esmaeil Khan, Atakhan, and their families obeyed and followed; and Afghans with Mirza Rafi Khan, Haji Fathkhan Afghan and Behboud son of Nazarkhan Ghalehgahi erected a burrow on one side of the citadel and escaped at night". However, given the length of time needed to bore a tunnel, the author might be referring to an earlier structure.

History

Construction 
Based on the existing documents, the Book of Divan-e-Lame  and local comments, construction of the Furg Citadel began in early 1160 AH, during the reign of Nader Shah Afshar, by Mirza Bagha Khan, son of the First Mirza Rafi Khan.  The citadel was completed by his son, the Second Mirza Rafi Khan.

However, the Divan-e-Lame also says:  "But, was it really started the building of the citadel by Mirza Bagha Khan and completed by his son, Mirza Rafi Khan (Lame's grandson) or is it one of the old buildings and these two persons and the former ones, everyone has had a hand in it and made effort to repair and complete it, is something that has not been achieved yet; not based on the written documents and not through oral promise of the elders. It is likely that Lame and his father had possessed the citadel and it was their place of residence and administration center and shelter   The Book of Haghayeghol Akhbr Naseri, discusses the events of the lunar year of 1268 about Mirza Rafi Khan:"In the same year, Mirza Rafi Khan, who was staying in Ghaenat places, started to oppose, General Pashakhan with two legions from city of Semnan and a collective of cavalry and forty cannons were also assigned to punish him. Mirza Rafi Khan went to Harat. Zahiroddoleh interceded for him, and his crime was pardoned."

Qajar era 
An inscription carved on the mortar surface of the water storage of the citadel indicates the lunar date of 1217.  This suggests that the building was repaired by an artisan named "Abosaeid Jaiki" in the early Qajar era.

Riazi Heravi writes in Einolvaghayeh Book as follows:  "Forg citadel is 12 miles away from Birjand and locates around plain and entrance of "Darmian" valley and has a lot of gardens and trees and enjoys a good climate, the citadel is on the top of a mountain of which walls and towers have been firmly constructed by mud bricks and its foundation was made by Ajin stone and has two Haji Shir around itself and two embankments each of which diameter is five cubits.

European visitors 
Furg Citadel was described by a "Doctor Forbes"  in 1814 AD, a "Colonel MacGerger"  in 1875, and a "Khanykf" and "Blue". MacGerger cited Forbes in his itinerary titled "A Journey to the Province of Khorasan" as follows: "The citadel has been built on the top of a hill at an altitude of 2000 to 2500 feet which could be threatened by the fire load from the highlands of the north and west. A mountain is located in the south and on the other two sides which is away 1200 yards from the peak to the walls of the citadel. Three water storages were provided inside the citadel which is said that the storage of their water will supply the utility of a great garrison for the period of one year and six months.

Archaeological excavation 
In 2001, an excavation was conducted at Furg Citadel.  It identified a stable, food storage areas, burrows and corridors connecting different sections of the citadel.

Evidence shows that the citadel was actually built in the Afsharieh era. The classification of Furg citadel as an Ismailia structure  is debatable.  Ismailia citadels  were constructed in remote and hidden from view.  This is because the Ismailia sects were waging warfare against government authorities.

Furg Citadel was probably an official citadel designed to hold government officials and troops to secure the region.   The citadel is built on a mountain top like other official citadels to provide a strategic location.  It was surrounded by the Forg village.

Like other official citadels in Iran, the Furg consisted of three sections:

 Kohandej (place of living the ruler), 
 Sharestan (Place of living of the people of village)  
 Rabath (farms and gardens) sections

See also

 Khorasan
 Iranian architecture

References 

Buildings and structures completed in the 12th century
Birjand
Castles in Iran
Castles of the Nizari Ismaili state
Architecture in Iran
Buildings and structures in South Khorasan Province
National works of Iran